José Miguel da Rocha Fonte  (born 22 December 1983) is a Portuguese professional footballer who plays as a centre-back for Ligue 1 club Lille and the Portugal national team.

Fonte started his professional career with Sporting CP B, moving to England with Crystal Palace in 2007. He signed for Southampton in 2010, where he made 288 appearances in all competitions, until he joined West Ham United in January 2017. He then represented Dalian Yifang in China and Lille in France, winning the Ligue 1 title with the latter in the 2020–21 season.

A Portuguese international since age 30, Fonte was part of the squad at two UEFA European Championship and the 2018 FIFA World Cup, winning UEFA Euro 2016.

Club career

Portugal
Born in Penafiel, Fonte finished his football education (after already having played there from ages 10 to 13) at Sporting CP. He only appeared with Sporting CP B as a senior, in the third division. He signed with Salgueiros in 2004, but the club was in severe financial difficulties and was liquidated shortly thereafter; as a result, he terminated his contract and transferred to Felgueiras in the Segunda Liga.

In the 2005 off-season, Fonte made his Primeira Liga debut with Vitória de Setúbal, where his performances attracted the eye of Benfica, who signed him in January 2006. He was immediately loaned out to fellow league team Paços de Ferreira. He finished the season with 26 league appearances and 1 goal, during a 2–2 away draw against Penafiel in which he also scored two in his own net– as both Paços and Setúbal managed to retain their status.

Fonte spent the 2006–07 season on loan to Estrela da Amadora, still in the top division, only missing five league games as the Lisbon-based club finished in ninth position.

Crystal Palace
In July 2007, Fonte moved on loan to Crystal Palace in England, being introduced in the team's starting line-up after a run of injuries. The move was made permanent at the end of the 2007–08 season, as Palace finished fifth and qualified to the promotion play-offs.

Fonte continued to feature regularly with the Londoners in the Football League Championship, even appearing as a makeshift striker when required.

Southampton

Fonte signed for Southampton on 9 January 2010 for a fee believed to be around the region of £1.2 million, signing a three-and-a-half-year contract. He made his debut one week later alongside two other recent signings, Jon Otsemobor and Danny Seaborne, in a 1–1 draw away to Millwall. His first goal for Southampton came on 28 August, in a 4–0 away win over Bristol Rovers.

After scoring seven league goals and helping Southampton win promotion to the second tier, Fonte was named in the League One Team of the Year for the 2010–11 season. He was also voted Southampton's Player of Year, achieving 64% of the vote, with Adam Lallana coming second with 18% and Dan Harding finishing third with 7%.

On 29 December 2011, Fonte signed a new contract keeping him at the club until June 2015. Southampton were top of the table when he signed, with the player having appeared in every league game at that point in the season. He eventually contributed 42 matches and 1 goal, which came against Coventry City in the final match of the season as the team earned a second consecutive promotion.

Fonte made his debut in the Premier League on 19 August 2012, playing the full 90 minutes in a 3–2 away loss to Manchester City. He netted his first goals in the competition in a 2–2 home draw with Fulham on 7 October, the second arriving in the last minute. On 24 August 2013, he scored a header in the 89th minute of the home game against Sunderland, rescuing a point for his team.

On 23 January 2014, Fonte was attacked by teammate Dani Osvaldo during a training session. Subsequently, the latter was loaned out to Juventus during the winter transfer window.

On 8 August 2014, Fonte penned a new three-year deal with Southampton running until June 2017, and was also named team captain. He made his 250th league appearance for the club on 16 October 2016, in a 3–1 home win against Burnley.

West Ham United
On 20 January 2017, Fonte signed for Premier League club West Ham United for a reported fee of £8 million (plus potential add-ons) on a two-and-a-half-year contract. He made his league debut on 1 February, in a 4–0 home defeat by Manchester City in which he conceded a penalty by bringing down Raheem Sterling.

On 4 November 2017, after a league match against one of his former teams, Crystal Palace, it was confirmed Fonte had suffered a foot injury that would sideline him for the rest of the year.

Dalian Yifang
Fonte completed a transfer to Chinese Super League club Dalian Yifang on 23 February 2018, joining for a reported fee of £5 million. On 15 July, he terminated his contract.

Lille
Fonte signed for French Ligue 1 club Lille on 20 July 2018, signing a two-year contract. The 37-year-old captained the team to the 2020–21 Ligue 1 title, their first since 2010–11, making 36 appearances and scoring 3 goals in the process.

International career

Fonte was called up to the Portuguese B squad for the Vale do Tejo tournament in 2006. On 24 January, he played against Slovenia as the match ended with a penalty shoot-out loss after a 1–1 draw.

On 3 October 2014, aged nearly 31, Fonte received his first call-up to the senior team, for a friendly with France and a UEFA Euro 2016 qualifier against Denmark. He made his debut in another friendly, playing the second half of a 1–0 win over Argentina at Old Trafford on 18 November.

Fonte was selected by manager Fernando Santos for his Euro 2016 squad. His first game in the tournament took place on 25 June, as he started alongside Southampton teammate Cédric Soares in the round-of-16 tie against Croatia, which Portugal won 1–0 after extra time. He went on to retain his position until the final, in which Portugal beat the hosts France 1–0.

Fonte was named in the final 23-man squads for both the 2018 FIFA World Cup in Russia and Portugal's victorious campaign in the 2019 UEFA Nations League Finals, as well as the delayed UEFA Euro 2020, where he didn't manage to leave the bench.

On 9 October 2021, aged 37, Fonte scored his first goal for the national team, in a 3-0 home win over Qatar.

On 24 March 2022, aged 38, Fonte earned his 50th cap in Portugal's World Cup qualifying Play-off match, against  Turkey, where he gave away a second-half penalty for a kick at Enes Ünal inside the penalty area. However, Burak Yılmaz, his teammate at Lille, missed the shot and the game ended 3–1 for Portugal, who then qualified for the final playoff game.

In October, he was named in Portugal's preliminary 55-man squad for the 2022 FIFA World Cup in Qatar. However, he did not make the final cut.

Personal life
Fonte's younger brother, Rui, is also a footballer. A forward, the two were teammates at Sporting (at youth level), Crystal Palace and Lille. Their father, Artur, played 12 seasons in the Portuguese top division.

Career statistics

Club

International

 Scores and results list Portugal's goal tally first, score column indicates score after each Fonte goal.

Honours
Southampton
Football League Trophy: 2009–10

Lille
Ligue 1: 2020–21
Trophée des Champions: 2021

Portugal
UEFA European Championship: 2016
UEFA Nations League: 2018–19
FIFA Confederations Cup third place: 2017

Individual
PFA Team of the Year: 2010–11 League One
Southampton Player of the Season: 2010–11, 2014–15

Orders
 Commander of the Order of Merit

References

External links

Profile at the Lille OSC website 
Profile at the Portuguese Football Federation website

1983 births
Living people
People from Penafiel
Portuguese footballers
Association football defenders
Primeira Liga players
Liga Portugal 2 players
Segunda Divisão players
Sporting CP B players
F.C. Felgueiras players
Vitória F.C. players
S.L. Benfica footballers
F.C. Paços de Ferreira players
C.F. Estrela da Amadora players
Premier League players
English Football League players
Crystal Palace F.C. players
Southampton F.C. players
West Ham United F.C. players
Chinese Super League players
Dalian Professional F.C. players
Ligue 1 players
Lille OSC players
Portugal under-21 international footballers
Portugal B international footballers
Portugal international footballers
UEFA Euro 2016 players
2017 FIFA Confederations Cup players
2018 FIFA World Cup players
UEFA Euro 2020 players
UEFA European Championship-winning players
UEFA Nations League-winning players
Portuguese expatriate footballers
Expatriate footballers in England
Expatriate footballers in China
Expatriate footballers in France
Portuguese expatriate sportspeople in England
Portuguese expatriate sportspeople in China
Portuguese expatriate sportspeople in France
Commanders of the Order of Merit (Portugal)
Sportspeople from Porto District